Greatest Hits is an album by the Commodores, released on Motown Records in 1978.

The album peaked at number 85 in Australia.

Track listing
 "Brick House"
 "Sweet Love"
 "This Is Your Life"
 "Too Hot ta Trot"
 "Easy"
 "Fancy Dancer"
 "Just To Be Close To You"
 "Slippery When Wet"
 "Machine Gun"
 "Three Times A Lady"

References 

1978 greatest hits albums
Commodores albums
Motown compilation albums